Bandera Falls is an unincorporated community in Bandera County, Texas, United States.  It is part of the San Antonio Metropolitan Statistical Area.

History
Bandera Falls started as a residential community in 1966 and had 10 houses. By 1990, it was listed as a community, but without census figures. The population was estimated to be 90 in 2009.

Geography
It lies along the left bank of the Medina River, just north of its outlet into Medina Lake, one of the largest bodies of water in South Texas.

Education
The Bandera Independent School District serves area students.

Notable people
 Joseph Gutheinz, retired NASA worker who has investigated stolen and missing moon rocks.

References

External links

Unincorporated communities in Texas
Unincorporated communities in Bandera County, Texas
Greater San Antonio